Yuri Yoshikawa (born 6 August 1971) is a Japanese snowboarder. She competed at the 1998 Winter Olympics and the 2002 Winter Olympics.

References

1971 births
Living people
Japanese female snowboarders
Olympic snowboarders of Japan
Snowboarders at the 1998 Winter Olympics
Snowboarders at the 2002 Winter Olympics
Sportspeople from Osaka
21st-century Japanese women